Aandavan  is an Indian Malayalam-language film directed by Akbar Jose and starring Kalabhavan Mani, Sindhu Menon and Jagathy Sreekumar. The film was telecasted on Mazhavil Manorama.

Plot
This movie revolves around Aandavan, a thief from the slum of Cochin.

Cast
 Kalabhavan Mani as Aandavan
 Sindhu Menon as S.I Sreerekha
 Jagathy Sreekumar as K.Parasmeswara Panikker
 Salim Kumar as Mayinkutti
 Irshad as Const.Rameshan
 Kulappuli Leela as Mariyamma
 Bijukuttan as Bhaskaran
 Seema G. Nair as Sarasu
 Narayanankutty as Narayankutty
 Indrans as Chandran
 Chali Pala as S.I Gangadharan
 Ponnamma Babu
 T. S. Raju as Aandavan's father
 Boban Alummoodan
 Kulappulli Leela as Mariyama
 Anand as C.I Sadashivan Paniker 
 Priyanka
 Nivia Rebin

Reception
Nowrunning wrote that "Andavan is as formulaic an action flick as has ever graced the silver screen. It's in reality a series of pointless fights, murders, verbal aggression and plenty of bloodshed frantically on the hunt for an interesting storyline". Indiaglitz wrote that "`Aandavan' is a regular Kalabhavan Mani affair -yet another take which glorify one-man vigilant justice. And as usual with his films, this too remains unsurprising and predictable to the core. In an obvious attempt at making a formulaic masala movie, the creators come up with another that turns out far from satisfactory".

References

2008 films
2000s Malayalam-language films